Ruth Cranston (pseudonym, Anne Warwick; November 14, 1887 – April 2, 1956) was an American author and lecturer on religion and other subjects.

Biography
A daughter of Methodist Bishop Earl Cranston, Ruth Cranston was born in Cincinnati, Ohio. She was taught by tutors in France and Switzerland, and traveled frequently with her family on her father's missionary work. She returned to the United States for college, and graduated from Goucher College in 1908.  While in college she wrote three articles on what women can do after graduation, which were published in The Delineator. She then went to travel abroad, first to Vienna, where she penned some articles for American publications.

Turning to writing novels, she proceeded to publish a number of novels under the pseudonym "Anne Warwick",
 The Unknown Woman (1912)
 Ashes of Incense (1912) (first published anonymously)
 The Meccas of the World (1913) (Title in England: My Cosmopolitan Year, published anonymously)
 Victory Law (1914)
 The Chalk Line (1915)
 The Unpretenders (1916)
 The Best People (1918)

References

External links

 The Ruth Cranston Papers, 1908-1957, at Berea College
 
 
 Compensation (1911) (full scan at Google books)

1887 births
1956 deaths
20th-century American novelists
American women novelists
Writers from Cincinnati
American expatriates in France
American expatriates in Switzerland
Goucher College alumni
20th-century American women writers
People from Sierra Madre, California
Novelists from California
Novelists from Ohio
Pseudonymous women writers
20th-century pseudonymous writers